This is a list of episodes from the fourth season of Columbo.

Broadcast history

The season originally aired Sundays at 8:30–10:00 pm (EST) as part of The NBC Sunday Mystery Movie.

DVD release
The season was released on DVD by Universal Home Video.

Episodes

Columbo 04
1974 American television seasons
1975 American television seasons